Damery is a commune in the Marne department in north-eastern France.

See also
 Communes of the Marne department
 Montagne de Reims Regional Natural Park

References

External links 
 

Communes of Marne (department)